The 1979 UAE President's Cup Final was the third final of the UAE President's Cup, the Emirati football cup competition. The match was contested by Sharjah and Al Ain. Sharjah was awarded the trophy for the first time after defeating Al Ain on the penalties, after 2-2.

Details

References

1979
Cup
Association football penalty shoot-outs
Al Ain FC matches
Sharjah FC matches